A land acknowledgement or territorial acknowledgement is a formal statement that a public event is taking place on land originally inhabited by indigenous peoples. In situations where it is used, it is often spoken at the beginning of an event. They have also become popular on social media platform biographies.

By country

Australia
In Australia, the Welcome to Country or Acknowledgement of Country is a ritual performed intended to highlight the cultural significance of the surrounding area to a particular Aboriginal Australian or Torres Strait Islander clan or language group. It has been performed since the 1970s, becoming more common since the early 2000s. It is important as a refutation of the colonial idea of terra nullius, which was overturned by the Mabo decision in 1992.

Canada
In Canada, land acknowledgments became more popular after the 2015 Truth and Reconciliation Commission report (which argued that the country's Indian residential school system had amounted to cultural genocide) and the election of Liberal prime minister Justin Trudeau that same year. By 2019, they were a regular practice at events including National Hockey League games, ballet performances, and parliament meetings.

United States
In the United States, the practice of land acknowledgments has been gaining momentum as well. The movement began with museums on the east coast and has progressively moved west over the last several years and spread to institutions of higher education, non-profit organizations, and local governments. After the 2020 Oscar land acknowledgment statement by Taika Waititi, the movement has received more attention, both positively and negatively. Every*Learner*Everywhere, supported by the Bill and Melinda Gates Foundation, has resources on the topic of land acknowledgment statements and the Association for the Study of Higher Education has established a guide for land acknowledgments as well. Albums such as Fiona Apple's Fetch the Bolt Cutters and Animal Collective's Time Skiffs have contained land acknowledgments of their recording studios in their respective liner notes.

Criticism 
Critics of land acknowledgments have described them as excesses of political correctness or expressed concerns that they amount to empty gestures that avoid addressing the issues of indigenous communities in context. Ensuring the factual accuracy of acknowledgments can be difficult due to problems like conflicting land claims or unrecorded land exchanges between indigenous groups.

References

External links

 Native Land Digital, Territory Acknowledgement (Canada)

Indigenous peoples of the Americas
Public speaking
Indigenous peoples of Australia